Erik Rosén (13 July 1883 – 3 January 1967) was a Swedish film actor. He appeared in more than 40 films between 1933 and 1953.

Selected filmography

 The Marriage Game (1935)
 Ocean Breakers (1935)
 Under False Flag (1935)
 The Lady Becomes a Maid (1936)
 The People of Bergslagen (1937)
 John Ericsson, Victor of Hampton Roads (1937)
 Dollar (1938)
 Sunny Sunberg (1941)
 The Talk of the Town (1941)
 Adventurer (1942)
 It Is My Music (1942)
 There's a Fire Burning (1943)
 Imprisoned Women (1943)
 Young Blood (1943)
 Turn of the Century (1944)
 Black Roses (1945)
 It Rains on Our Love (1946)
 Johansson and Vestman (1946)
 Don't Give Up (1947)
 Dance, My Doll (1953)

References

External links

1883 births
1967 deaths
Swedish male film actors